Bachelor of Ayurvedic Medicine and Surgery (B.A.M.S.) is a professional degree focused on Ayurveda offered in India, Nepal, Bangladesh, and Sri Lanka.

Ayurveda is a type of alternative medicine, and the study of Ayurveda is pseudoscientific while the practice can be classified as protoscience or unscientific.

About
A 2001 report from the World Health Organization noted that Ayurveda was widely practiced in India, Nepal, Bangladesh, and Sri Lanka, the four corresponding nations that offer the BAMS degree. Ayurveda was generally not integrated with the national health system of nations outside of the Indian subcontinent.

India 
In India, the curriculum includes the study of Ayurveda and corresponding Ayurvedic subjects such as Rachana Sharira, Kriya Sharira, Dravyuaguna, Svasthavritta and Yoga, Roga Nidana and Vikriti Vijnana, Kaya Chikitsa, Kaumara Bhritya, Prasuti Tantra, Shalya Tantra, Shalakya Tantra etc. along with human anatomy, physiology, pathology & diagnostic procedures, principles of medicine, pharmacology, toxicology, forensic medicine, E.N.T, gynecology & obstetrics, ophthalmology and principles of surgery from modern medicine. The syllabus also includes ancient and medieval classics, sometimes in the Sanskrit language. Institutions in India that offer the degree include the National Institute of Ayurveda and All India Institute of Ayurveda, Delhi.

In India, a student can go on to earn a master's degree in the form of MD (Ayurveda) and MS (Ayurveda), a PhD, and clinical doctorate degrees in traditional and complementary medicine at the university level. There are also opportunities to perform research, work in hospital and healthcare administration, and in health supervision.

In a report from 2020, the World Health Organization stated there was "a history of combining allopathic and traditional medicine systems in India, including through medical education." The WHO described AYUSH and conventional medical systems as "separate and parallel at the levels of governance, organisation, education and service delivery."

Permission to practice medicine 
BAMS graduates have been permitted to practice medicine in the state of Maharashtra. In the state of Karnataka, BAMS doctors appointed in primary health centres in rural areas can practice modern-medicine in case of "emergencies".

References

External links 
 Central Council of Indian Medicine  (CCIM), the apex body in India which regulates education and practice of BAMS doctors

Ayurveda, Medicine and Surgery Bachelor of
 
Academic degrees of India
Medical degrees
Medical education in India